Kolinchipatti is a village in Tamil Nadu state, India, lying between Dindigul and Madurai, near Nilakkotai. 
It is very near to Kodaikanal Road (approx 1 km away). It is very famous for flower cultivation. Particularly the flower called Nerium oleander (in Tamil "arali") is being cultivated abundantly. And other kind of flowers like rose, jasmine, jamanki, pitchipoo, kaakarataan poo, etc. are cultivated here. Apart from flower cultivation sugarcane, paddy, mulberry, mango, sapota, grapes, ground nuts, etc.
Presently, the village is facing widespread drought and unemployment, as a result of which many are migrating to other places in search of better jobs. Yet another reason is that young generation shows no interest in the traditional farming business as unfortunately it is not attractive any more in terms of financial return.
The caste system of TamilNadu is still prevalent there, and a majority of the residents are Gowders. There are Naickars in the nearby village of Meenakshipuram.  

Villages in Dindigul district